The Thomas Burke Monument, also known as Judge Thomas Burke, is a 1929 outdoor sculpture commemorating Thomas Burke by Hermon Atkins MacNeil, located in Volunteer Park, in Seattle's Capitol Hill neighborhood, in the U.S. state of Washington. The monument, which is made of granite, marble, and bronze, was dedicated in 1930. It is part of the Seattle Office of Arts & Culture.

See also

 1929 in art

References

External links
 MacNeil's ~ Thomas Burke Monument ~ 1929 at HermonAtkinsMacNeil.com

1929 sculptures
1930 establishments in Washington (state)
Bronze sculptures in Washington (state)
Capitol Hill, Seattle
Granite sculptures in Washington (state)
Marble sculptures in the United States
Monuments and memorials in Seattle
Outdoor sculptures in Seattle
Sculptures of men in Washington (state)